Sattar is a male Muslim given name and surname. 

It occurs in the compound form
Abdul Sattar, where further details can be found.

People with the name in its simple form include:

Given name
Sattar (singer) (born 1949) birth name Hasan Sattar, Iranian pop and traditional singer
Sattar Alvi, Pakistani fighter pilot
Sattar Bahlulzade (1909–1974), Azerbaijani painter
Sattar Hamedani (born 1974), Iranian footballer
Sattar Khan (1868–1914), Iranian revolutionary soldier
Sattar Memon (born 1947), Indian-American doctor and author
Sattar Seid (born 1987), Iranian skier
Sattar Zare (born 1982), Iranian footballer

Surname
Arshia Sattar (born 1960), Indian translator and author
Aziz Sattar (born 1925), Malaysian actor
Farooq Sattar (born 1960), Pakistani politician
Hassan Sattar (born 1949), Iranian pop singer
M. A. Sattar (1925-2009), Bangladeshi industrialist and politician
Mohammad Abdus Sattar (1925-2011), Indian Footballer
Naveed Sattar, Scottish medical researcher
Reefat Bin-Sattar (born 1974), Bangladeshi chess player
Zita Sattar (born 1975), English actress

Other uses
Sattar (missile), Iranian missile

See also
Sattar snowtrout, species of fish

Arabic masculine given names